Festival of Ideas of Ideas Festival may refer to:

Adelaide Festival of Ideas, held in Adelaide, South Australia, since 1999
Aspen Ideas Festival, held in Aspen, Colorado, U.S. since 2005
Bristol Festival of Ideas, held in Bristol, England, since 2005
Ideas Festival, formerly held in Brisbane, Queensland, Australia (2006–2011)
York Festival of Ideas, held in York, England, since 2011

See also
Pebble Beach Authors & Ideas Festival, held in Pebble Beach, California, U.S., since 2013 (formerly Carmel Authors and Ideas Festival, since 2007)
Festival of Dangerous Ideas, held in Sydney, Australia, since 2009
International Festival of Arts & Ideas, held in New Haven, Connecticut, U.S., since 1996